Ian Gallagher (born 20 November 1950) is an Australian cricketer. He played in one first-class match for Queensland in 1982/83.

See also
 List of Queensland first-class cricketers

References

External links
 

1950 births
Living people
Australian cricketers
Queensland cricketers
Cricketers from Brisbane